F/X2 (also known as F/X2: The Deadly Art of Illusion) is a 1991 American action thriller film directed by Richard Franklin and starring Bryan Brown and Brian Dennehy. It is a sequel to the 1986 film F/X. This was Franklin's final American film before he returned to his native Australia.

Plot

Rollie Tyler (Bryan Brown) is a well-respected designer of film special effects. He uses his expertise to design high-end robotic toys, such as a robot clown controlled by a telemetry suit and named Bluey, or to create fun effects such as safely setting his finger aflame with a gel covering. When his girlfriend’s ex-husband, Mike Brandon (Tom Mason), is assigned to stakeout a killer who had murdered a model but served a reduced sentence, he asks Rollie to create a trap to put the murderer back in prison. The trap involves using a supermodel getting ready to have a shower in the apartment across the street from the murderer, and once he’s shown to the team watching him that he’s about to take violent action, the supermodel is switched out the apartment’s back door and Mike takes her place to arrest the murderer. Rollie set-up small cameras in the apartment as well so that he could watch from his van in the street. As the murderer enters the apartment, another man appears behind Mike and kills him. Rollie sees this and rushes towards the apartment, passing Mike’s killer in the stairwell before recognizing him. Meanwhile, Mike’s boss Ray Silak (Philip Bosco) enters the apartment with the team and shoots the model murderer. Rollie tells Silak that the killer got away but Silak wonders why he would think that there was a third person in the apartment. Rollie is suspicious and secretly collects his hidden cameras but must leave one behind. Rollie immediately calls Leo McCarthy (Brian Dennehy), a cop he had worked with before, and leaves a message to say that he’s in trouble and needs help.

The next day, Rollie, his girlfriend Kim (Rachel Ticotin) and her son Chris go to Mike’s house to collect some personal items. The house is being thoroughly searched by cops. They are even searching through the files on floppy disks, including Chris’s game disk which is snatched away by Kim. Silak is there. He gives Rollie back the camera from the crime scene, asking why the apartment was being filmed. He now knows that Rollie saw Mike’s killer and plants the idea that it may have been a cop. He asks Rollie if Mike mentioned any old cases he was working on. As soon as they leave Silak, Rollie suspects Mike was set up and drives Kim and Chris to her sister’s house to keep them safe. That night at their loft, Rollie looks through the camera’s footage. He sees Silak planting evidence to indicate that the model murderer also killed Mike. Rollie doesn’t notice the door bolts being unlocked as he searches the recording. Just as Rollie finds footage of the killer, the killer appears before him and demands the recording. Rollie is able to manoeuvre the killer to be in range of Bluey and uses the telemetry suit to control the robot’s actions while it fights the intruder. The killer overcomes the robot and the fight leads to the fire escape, with Leo showing up to save the day in the nick of time.

At Leo’s closed bar, he listens to the story from Rollie and deduces that Silak is interested in an old, unsolved case that Mike was working on in his spare time. The next day, he asks his old police contact Velez if she would discreetly check into Mike’s cases. Meanwhile, Rollie sneaks into Silak’s office and taps his phone. Back at the bar, Leo and Rollie intercept a call from Silak to someone named Neely (Kevin J. O'Connor), an inmate who is given the details to say for his court appearance in exchange for information. The next day, Leo arrives in court to listen to the case that Neely is testifying for. His testimony makes the case. Leo meets with Neely’s lawyer after the court session, an old friend of his named Liz Kennedy (Joanna Gleason). He warns her that Neely’s testimony was supplied to him. Leo visits Neely at the prison and sees him visiting the bedside of a dying old inmate. Although Neely refuses to speak with him, Leo finds out that the old man is Carl Becker.

Back at the bar, Leo brings Rollie up to speed with Becker’s notoriety. The old inmate had stolen solid gold medallions that were cast by Michelangelo depicting the bronze figures in the ceiling of the Sistine Chapel. He was arrested quite shortly after the theft but the coins were never recovered. This was the case that Mike had been working on. While this conversation is happening, the killer follows Kim as she leaves her workplace. Rollie remembers the floppy disk that had Chris’s games on it had a file named Becker. He calls Chris and learns that Kim went to work even though he had told her it was unsafe. Rollie leaves to find Kim while Leo arranges for Chris to send the file to Velez by modem, the nearest one being at the mall. At the mall, Chris is ready to send the file just as his mom arrives, followed closely by the killer who then threatens her. Chris begins the file transfer. Leo is waiting with Velez and watches as the file is received. One name that is new from the file is Samson. The mall closes just as Rollie arrives and barges his way in. He finds Kim and Chris being threatened by the killer. He manages to get them away from the killer and into the mall grocery store. Rollie uses the items he can find to create traps for the killer while they find a way out. All exits are blocked, so Rollie lures the killer to the meat packaging machine and incapacitates him.

Leo takes Velez for a celebratory dinner at his favourite Chinese place - a street vendor in Chinatown. Just as they begin to eat, a single gunshot kills Velez before a drive-by shooting targets the street vendor. Meanwhile, Neely makes a last visit to a dying Becker, asking him to unburden his soul by sharing the location of the coins. Later, Leo drinks in the near dark of his bar as Rollie comes in. They update each other about Velez and the killer, who is just a hired thug. The thug did give up the information that Silak has a helicopter booked for that weekend. Leo visits Liz. His superficial wounds are looked after as her cat demands his attention. He tells Liz his plans regarding capturing Silak at the location where the chopper will be and insists that she be there in person, as it would help her career. Neely meets Silak and they are both followed by Rollie. They go to a cathedral so that Neely can retrieve the hidden coins. Cut to Rollie gathering special effects gear in the back of his van.

That weekend, Neely and Silak enter a large, secluded house with the gold medallions. They are met by several guards, the buyer, and an authenticator. Meanwhile, Rollie sets off various effects to trap the guard dogs and take the guards out of commission one by one. Leo and Liz arrive and Leo gives her a gun just in case there’s trouble. As the authenticator examines the coins, Leo walks into the room with his gun drawn. He is soon unarmed by Liz herself and relegated to informing Neely and Silak about the buyer - he’s part of the mob. The coins are authenticated, a guard takes them out to the boat, and the chopper arrives. Leo asks questions of everyone about the situation and learns that the mob plans to return the coins to the Vatican. Suddenly, an explosion outside unnerves everyone. Leo presses Liz to give up her gun and he is shot as she panics. Neely takes her gun just as the guard, on fire, bursts into the room from the backyard. Neely and Silak grab the money and the coins from the guard and run to the chopper. Once there, Neely shoots Silak but the gun has blanks. Silak shoots Neely instead and boards the chopper. Liz turns her attention away from the chaos outside only to see Leo very much alive. The burned guard turns out to be Rollie covered in the firesafe gel. Rollie runs out to the boat while Leo makes his disappointment known to Liz. He had discovered her involvement in the scheme when he saw the name given to her cat - Samson. Her criminal involvement was confirmed when the backup she was to arrange for didn’t show up. Sirens are heard approaching. It is the backup that Leo had called just in case they were needed. Liz is left to wait for them. Leo joins Rollie in the boat.

In the chopper, Silak becomes worried when the helicopter changes direction and begins to fly haphazardly. He berates the pilot only to see that it is a clown. Rollie, in the telemetry suit in the boat, has Bluey let go of the controls, which Silak quickly grabs. The clown robot reaches behind its seat for the case with the money then jumps from the plane. Rollie and Leo fish the robot and case from the water. Leo wonders how long it will take them to dry the money when Rollie produces the gold medallions that he had safely hidden. Leo informs him that the mob was going to return the coins to the Vatican so he shouldn’t have stolen them. A collection plate is being passed around a church service. It stops between two men and they drop a set of golden coins into it. Afterwards, Leo and Rollie leave the church and decide what they should have for lunch with their newly-dried money. As they walk and banter about food, the camera pans out to show that they are in Rome. During the credits Silak is still in the helicopter and thus ends the movie.

Cast
 Bryan Brown as Roland "Rollie" Tyler
 Brian Dennehy as Leo McCarthy
 Rachel Ticotin as Kim Brandon
 Joanna Gleason as Assistant District Attorney Liz Kennedy
 Philip Bosco as Lieutenant Ray Silak, NYPD
 Kevin J. O'Connor as Matt Neely
 Tom Mason as Mike Brandon, NYPD
 Dominic Zamprogna as Chris Brandon, Mike's Son 
 Josie de Guzman as Marisa Velez, Police Computer Expert
 John Walsh as Rado
 Peter Boretski as Carl Becker, Medallion Thief
 Lisa Fallon as Kylie, Model For Decoy
 Lee Broker as DeMarco
 Philip Akin as Detective McQuay 
 Tony De Santis as Detective Santoni
 James Stacy as The Cyborg

Production
Filming took place in Toronto. Vic Armstrong was called in to direct the last few weeks. He said Franklin "had some kind of personal problems going on, but I think there was a lot of stuff happening behind the scenes that I didn't know about."

Critical reception
The sequel was not as successful as the first film. Kevin Thomas of the Los Angeles Times commented that "'FX2' is more elaborate [than the original], especially in its gadgetry, and at times more improbable than the original, but it’s just as much fun, largely because Brian Dennehy’s veteran Irish cop now gets equal screen time with Brown." Stephen Holden of The New York Times opined that "as long as it is fixated on gadgetry, 'FX2' is reasonably entertaining. But when the movie focuses on plot and character, it turns quite dotty in an amiable way. The story is as far-fetched as it is tortuous and deals with police corruption, the theft of some priceless gold coins, relations between the Mafia and the Vatican, and a boy's computer software. It also involves two double crosses, neither of which comes as much of a surprise. At the end of the movie, loose ends are dangling everywhere." Paul Willistein of The Morning Call of Allentown, Pennsylvania dismissed the film as "kiddie fare, lacking the intelligence and wit of the original with plot holes so big the real special effect here will be holding the audience's attention span." On review aggregator Rotten Tomatoes, the film has a "rotten" score of 41% from 17 reviews. Roger Ebert gave the film two stars out of four and said, "There should be a special category for movies that are neither good nor bad, but simply excessive. [...] F/X 2 is actually the kind of movie that rewards inattention. Sit quietly in the theater and watch it, and you will be driven to distraction by its inconsistencies and loopholes. But watch it on video, paying it half a mind, and you might actually find it entertaining."

Box office
The movie debuted at No. 1.

References

External links
 
 
 

1990 films
1990 action thriller films
American action thriller films
American action comedy films
American independent films
American sequel films
1990s English-language films
Orion Pictures films
Films directed by Richard Franklin (director)
Films scored by Lalo Schifrin
Films with screenplays by Bill Condon
1990s American films